Lyon Hockey Club Les Lions (LHC The Lions) is the ice hockey team of Lyon, France. The team currently competes in The French Ligue Magnus on 13 January 2014 it was announced they will have a partnership with the Tampa Bay Lighting and Syracuse Crunch. in 2019, the professional team was dissolved after bankruptcy.

History

1898–1953: Ice Hockey in Lyon 
Ice hockey was played in Lyon as early as 1898 on a rink located on the Boulevard des Belges where today the Guimet Museum stands. The Sporting Club de Lyon (Lyon Sporting Club) won the national Coupe Magnus title in 1905 and 1908 but the rink was converted to a museum in 1909 and Lyon was without a rink and a team for the next 44 years.

1953–1997: The CPL Era 
In 1953 the Club des Patineurs Lyonnais (Skating Club of Lyon or CPL) was founded and in 1956 the Lyon team won France's Division 1 ice hockey championship. In 1963 CPL built the Patinoire Charlemagne that still today serves as the home of Lyon ice sports. In their new home CPL won France's Division 2 ice hockey championship in both 1972 and 1989. Christophe Geoffroy's management forces the CPL to the liquidation in 1997

1997-Pres.: Lyon Hockey Club 
Following the collapse of CPL local businessman Christophe Geoffroy founded Hockey sur glace lyonnais Elite (Lyon Elite Ice Hockey). Teamed with the Lyon Hockey Club Association, an association charged with developing junior ice hockey, the Lyon Hockey Club was born. The new team experienced quick success and twice finished third in France's Ligue Magnus in 1997 and 1998. LHC qualified for Europe's Continental Cup in 1999 and reached the quarter finals before being eliminated.

By 2000 LHC had been relegated to France's Division 3 championship but quickly began to rise through national ranks again. In the 2001 season Lyon reached and won the Division 2 championship and earned a place in Division 1 for season 2002. A poor season in 2002 saw the team return to the second division once again and, despite reaching the final in 2007, LHC remains a Division 2 team in 2008.

Team Colours and Jersey

Logo 
The logo of the LHC features a red head of a lion in profile on a white background with the name of the team above (in white on red) and the team's nickname – 'Les Lions' – in white text on a blue background below.

Red, white and blue are both the colours of France and the colours of the city of Lyon.

Jersey 
The LHC play in red, blue, black and white jerseys.

The jersey has changed in recent years from a predominantly white jersey in season 2006 to predominantly red in season 2007 and predominantly blue for season 2008.

The front of the jersey features a stylised image of a lion and bears the logo of the LHC's major sponsor, Flunch.

The jerseys are provided by equipment sponsor Nike Bauer.

Broadcasters 
LHC media partners include Télé Lyon Métropole, the Tribune de Lyon and Virgin Radio.

Télé Lyon Métropole 
LHC matches are a regular feature on Télé Lyon Métropole's Sunday sports review, Dimanche Sports. LHC players are also interviewed frequently for other TLM programs including Lundi Sport.

Tribune de Lyon 
The Tribune de Lyon produces a pre-season guide to the LHC each year and reports on matches each week.

Virgin Radio 
As well as reporting on LHC matches Virgin Radio provides the background music for matches. While the playlist varies by season current songs on the match-night programme include Sleeping Satellite (Junior Caldera) and No Stress (Laurent Wolf).

Sponsors 
Major sponsors of the LHC are Fiat, Flunch, Kinnarps, Metifiot, Virgin Radio, Nike Bauer and Air Canada. The LHC also has a number of minor sponsors and supporting sponsors.

Home Ice 

The LHC plays all its home matches at the Patinoire Charlemagne.

Commissioned in 1967 and opened in 1969, the Patinoire Charlemagne's distinctive architectural style incorporating concrete, glass and aluminum saw it placed on the Rhône-Alpes' List of 20th century Buildings of Architectural Interest.

Since May 2006 more than 3.7 million euros have been spent to refurbish the arena and stadium.

Patinoire Charlemagne offers many services apart from the ice hockey rink including medical facilities, a bar, a dance hall, meeting rooms and a press centre.

The Patinoire Charlemagne is also well known for hosting other ice sports, particularly figure skating. Each year the rink hosts the Pôle France de danse sur glace and world champion figure skaters Marina Anissina and Gwendal Peizerat both train at Charlemagne.

The Patinoire Charlemagne was one of the host stadiums for the 2006 European Figure Skating Championships.

The ice is Olympic sized (60 metres long by 30 metres wide) and has a capacity of 4 400 spectators.

Roster
Updated 8 February 2019.

Past Players 

While not considered a breeding ground for great players Lyon has been able to both develop young stars and attract former NHL stars to the Patinoire Charlemagne.

LHC alumni have played in the North American National Hockey League (NHL), the French Ligue Magnus and on French Olympic teams.

Among the most notable of LHC past-players are:

  Baptiste Amar – 2002 French Olympic team
 / Roger Dubé – 1998 French Olympic team
 / Jean-Marc Gaulin – Right-wing for the NHL's Quebec Nordiques 1982–87
  Laurent Meunier – Captain of France national team, 2002 French Olympic team, two-time Ligue Magnus MVP
 / André Svitac – 1992 French Olympic team

LHC Junior Squads 
As well as the senior team the LHC competes in six levels of junior ice hockey.

LHC Moustiques 
A team for players aged less than 9 years.

LHC Poussins 
A team for players aged under 11 years. The team is coached by LHC player Geoffrey Paillet.

LHC Benjamins 
A team for players aged under 13 years. The team is coached by LHC player Pascal Margerit.

LHC Minimes 
Two teams – Minimes Excellence and Minime Elite – for players aged under 15 years.

LHC Cadets 
A team for players aged under 18 years.

Mascot, Nickname and Supporters 
The official mascot of the LHC is Pepito the Lion. Always in attendance at home games, Pepito wears a Lyon hockey jersey and a straw hat. The nickname of the LHC is 'The Lions' and relates to the symbol of city of Lyon.

The most vocal supporters of the LHC are the Lions Gones. This group of fans are similar to football ultras and share their name with the Bad Gones of the city's Olympique Lyonnais football team.

According to the Tribune de Lyon, despite being a Division 2 team the LHC attracts the highest crowds of any hockey team in France in any league, save for Ligue Magnus teams Grenoble and Rouen.

Notes 

1.Crunch, Senators to hold camp in Lyon
2.Historique du Lyon Hockey Club.
3.Historique du Lyon Hockey Club.
4.Historique du Lyon Hockey Club.
5.Historique du Lyon Hockey Club.
6.Historique du Lyon Hockey Club.
7.Historique du Lyon Hockey Club.
8.FFHG Division 2 2008–2009 Teams.
9.Les Lions dans la douleur.
10.Et de deux pour les Lions.
11.A l'image d'un derby.
12.Strict minimum pour les Lions.
13.Première défaite des Lions.
14.Avec la manière.
15.FFHG Division 2.
16.Lyon Hockey Club: Nos Partenaires.
17.Lyon Hockey Club: Nos Partenaires.
18.Patinoire Charlemagne.
19.Moustiques.
20.LHC Poussins.
21.LHC Benjamins.
22.LHC Minimes.
23.LHC Cadets.
24.LHC Espoirs.

References

External links 
 Lyon Hockey Club – Official Site
 Lions Gones – Supporters Club

Ice hockey teams in France
Sport in Lyon